Small Potatoes may refer to:
 "Small Potatoes" (Hawaii Five-O), a 1978 episode of Hawaii Five-O
 "Small Potatoes" (The X-Files), an episode of The X-Files
 Small Potatoes (1999 TV series), a 1999 to 2001 British TV sitcom
 Small Potatoes (2011 TV series), a 2011 children's TV series